Policy Studies Organization (PSO) is an academic organization whose purpose is to advance the study of policy analysis by publishing academic journals, books, sponsoring conferences and producing programs, curriculum, and videos.

History 
In 1972, the Policy Studies Organization formed out of a number of groups including the American Political Science Association to focus on important public policy issues. Some of the goals of the PSO included sponsoring conferences, obtaining discounts for subscriptions and books, and encouraging conventions both regionally and nationally. The Policy Studies Journal was soon established alongside the PSO to focus on policy matters like environmental protection, education, peace, and civil liberties. There are now 35 journals in different fields and more than 1000 books in print from the PSO's Westphalia Press.

The Policy Studies Organization – a related society of the American, Midwest, Southern and International Political Science Associations, as well as of the International Studies Association and several other societies – grew out of a concern that there was a distance between research and practice in policy. In other words, research knowledge had to be effectively disseminated and had to reach those who actually set policies. The goal of the Policy Studies Organization includes  bringing together people who felt that policies (and not just government policies, but policies of companies, of universities, and indeed of all kinds of institutions) should be informed policies based on many different academic disciplines.

PSO includes senior executives, undergraduate and graduate students, state legislators, architects, judges, military officers, interested in policy studies, environmentalists who want to “green” decision making, NGO executives who worry about the future of volunteerism, professors who are working on curriculum revision, government officials in numerous agencies — in short, PSO is for intellectually active people of all persuasions. The main office of Policy Studies Organization is in Washington, DC, in the historic Bank Building in Dupont Circle but there are offices across the world, including in Asia and Europe.

Conferences 
The Policy Studies Organization sponsors major international conferences year round to promote multidisciplinary conversations of relevant policy issues. The goal of these events is to encourage NGOs, government officials, students, academics, and the general public to engage in dialogues about on-going policy concerns. These conferences are co-sponsored by the American Public University System. The following are conferences held by the PSO annually:

PSW Lecture Series
Middle East Dialogue
World Conference on Fraternalism, Social Capital, and Civil Society
International Criminology Conference
Space Education & Strategic Applications Conference
Dupont Summit on Science, Technology, and Environmental Policy
The PSO is also working on a new series of conferences with Sculpture Review, and has an upcoming conference series on the uses of public space, with the first of planned conferences occurring on June 4, 2023 in Washington DC. In addition, the PSO assists with the annual meeting of the Far West Popular Culture Association Conference.

Journals
Asian Politics & Policy
Digest of Middle East Studies
European Policy Analysis
Latin American Policy
Policy & Internet
Policy Studies Journal
Policy Studies Yearbook
Politics & Policy
Poverty & Public Policy
Review of Policy Research
Risk, Hazards & Crisis in Public Policy
World Affairs
World Medical & Health Policy
World Water Policy

Open Access Journals 

Journal of Critical Infrastructure Policy
Journal of Elder Policy
Journal of Online Learning Research and Practice
Ritual, Secrecy, & Civil Society
International Journal of Criminology
World Food Policy
Journal on Policy and Complex Systems
New Water Policy and Practice
Sexuality, Gender, and Policy
Global Security and Intelligence Studies
Arts & International Affairs
Popular Culture Review
Space Education and Strategic Applications
Saber & Scroll
China Policy Journal
Indian Politics & Policy
International Journal of Open Educational Resources

Publications 
A key component of the Policy Studies Organization is its publications. Through its journals, book series, and open access journals, the PSO aims to disseminate policy scholarship. Many of the journals are published through Wiley-Blackwell or through open access. The PSO also publishes antiquated and original books through its own Westphalia Press imprint; titles range on subjects like history, art, politics, and the government. They recently published All Flowers Bloom by Kawika Guillermo, Winner of the 2021 Reviewers Choice Gold Award for Best General Fiction/Novel.

Westphalia Press 
Westphalia Press is the imprint and book-publishing division of the Policy Studies Organization. Westphalia Press takes its name from the kingdom of the same name which has long been incorporated into Germany, but was one of the first European principalities to affirm constitutional rights of its subjects and which had a robust printing and publishing tradition over the centuries.

Westphalia Press is part of the Policy Studies Organization’s longtime mission to disseminate scholarship internationally, widely and cost effectively. Westphalia Press publishes original and classic reprints of scholarly and antiquarian books in a wide range of subjects, including history, health, art, literature, politics, science and government. Their publications have been the subject of articles in the New York Times, Washington Post, and numerous other outlets. Westphalia Press has published over 1,000 titles, and in addition, the Policy Studies Organization has created more than 300 books in partnership with a number of leading companies, including Macmillan, Lexington, and Gale. Some major featured categories of holdings by Westphalia Press include diplomacy and international affairs, health policy, art, freemasonry, and military history and policy; however, there are numerous other featured subjects, such as cookbooks, games, literature, health policy, environmental studies, religious studies, and food/agricultural policy.

Presidents of the Policy Studies Organization 
The current president of the PSO is Paul J. Rich. Past presidents include: James Anderson, Walter Beach, William Browne, William Crotty, Kenneth Dolbeare, Yehezkel Dror, William Dunn, Thomas Dye, Matthew Holden, Richard Hula, Helen Ingram, Dorothy James, Charles Jones, Rita Mae Kelly, Robert Lane, Martin Levin, Robert Lineberry, Theodore Lowi, Duncan Macrae, Jr., Dean Mann, Daniel Mazmanian, Guy Peters, Harrell Rogers, Thomas Vocino, Larry Wade, Carol Weiss, Louise White, Aaron Wildavsky.

References

External links
Policy Studies Organization Website

Academic organizations based in the United States
Public policy